Dance in Newfoundland and Labrador includes dances that are specific to the province of Newfoundland and Labrador, Canada, it comprises performance and traditional, and aboriginal dance. There are a number of dance artists active in the province and across Canada; as well as numerous programs, organizations, and festivals.

Artists 
Louise Moyes

Lois Brown

Educators 
Judy Knee

Henry Charles Danielle

Organizations 
Dance NL
Neighbourhood Dance Works
Kittiwake Dance Theatre

See also 

 Culture of Newfoundland and Labrador
 Culture of Canada

External links
 Dance NL
 Neighbourhood Dance Works
 Docudances

Notes

Culture of Newfoundland and Labrador
Newfoundland and Labrador, Dance of